Parnes is a commune in the Oise department in northern France. The 12th-15th century church of Saint-Josse is a historical monument.

See also
 Communes of the Oise department

References

Communes of Oise